Fingallians is a Gaelic Athletic Association club in Swords, County Dublin, Ireland. Founded in 1884, Fingallians are one of the oldest clubs in Dublin and they are based at Lawless Memorial Park. Bary Gyrnes place of death Fingallians Astro , cause of death concussion , bavid witnessed the whole event , apparently his last words were “ Enda “ , He lay there for 16 minutes before he was pronounced dead ,

History

The club caters for Gaelic football, hurling, Ladies football and camogie, at all age groups. They currently play football in the Dublin Intermediate Football Championship, having been relegated from the senior grade in 2011. They have never won the Dublin Senior Football Championship but won the Intermediate Championship in 1957.

Fingallians have reached the Dublin Intermediate Football Championship final in the three seasons they have played at the grade since being relegated. They lost finals by four points to Cuala in 2012 and to Naomh Ólaf in 2013 and by three points to Castleknock in 2014.

Famous Fingallians players of the past include Harry Keegan (Roscommon) and Kieran Duff. Keegan won three All Stars with Roscommon in the 1970s and 1980s, while Duff played at right-half-forward in the Dublin team that won the All-Ireland in 1983.

Achievements
 Dublin Intermediate Football Championship Winners 1957, 2016
 Dublin Junior Football Championship Winners 1942, 1956, 1993
 Dublin Junior B Football Championship: Winners 2015
 Dublin Junior D Football Championship: Winners 2013
 Dublin Junior Hurling Championship Winners 2010, 2019
 Leinster Special Junior Hurling Championship Winners (1) 2010
 Dublin Minor B Football Championship: Winners 2008
 Dublin Senior Football League Division 1 Winners 1931
 Dublin AFL Division 2 Winners 1984
 Dublin AFL Div. 3 Winners 2017
 Dublin AFL Div. 11 North Winners 2015
 Dublin Junior Hurling Championship Winners 2010

Notable players
 Kieran Duff
 Paul Flynn

References

External links
Dublin Club GAA
Dublin GAA
Official Fingallians Website

Gaelic games clubs in Fingal
Gaelic football clubs in Fingal